The African island country of Seychelles competed at the 2012 Summer Olympics in London, United Kingdom, held from 27 July to 12 August 2012. This was the nation's eighth appearance at the Olympics, except the 1988 Summer Olympics in Seoul because of its partial support to the North Korean boycott.

The Seychelles Olympic and Commonwealth Games Association (SOCGA) sent the nation's smallest delegation to the Games. A total of 6 athletes, 4 men and 2 women, competed in four different sports. Four Seychellois athletes received their spots in track and field, and in swimming by wild card entries. Judoka and Olympic qualifier Dominic Dugasse was the nation's flag bearer at the opening ceremony. For the first time since 1984, Seychellois athletes did not qualify in sailing and weightlifting.

Seychelles has yet to win its first ever Olympic medal.

Athletics

With no one outright qualifying Jean-Yves Esparon was picked to compete by the Seychelles Athletics Federation, he had just recently broke the national junior 200 meters record. The 17 year old ran his heat in 21.99 seconds and came in 8th so didn't qualify for the next round. Lissa Labiche received an invite to the Games from the IAAF after winning the gold medal at the African Athletics Championships, at the Olympics she was the youngest female high jumper and finished 10th in her qualifying pool and 20th overall so didn't reach the final.

Men

Women

Boxing

Seychelles has qualified one boxer.
Allisop won his ticket to the 2012 Summer Olympics when he reached the semifinals at the African Olympic qualification tournament held in Morocco, at the games he was up against Indian boxer Jai Bhagwan who had reached the quarterfinals of the 2011 World Amateur Boxing Championships in Baku. Allisop lost all three rounds with the final score being 8-18.

Men

Judo

Seychelles has qualified 1 judoka
Judoka Dugasse automatically qualified through the African Judo Union Continental quota when he amassed over 30 points for his weight division, Dugasse was unlucky to have been drawn against 2008 Summer Olympics bronze medalist Henk Grol and he was beaten after 1 minute 27 seconds.

Swimming

Both swimmers were invited to compete by FINA, Mangroo finished his heat in 6th place and 50th overall so didn't qualify for the next round, Fanchette was only 14 years old and finished her heat last and 35th overall and didn't advance to the next round.

Men

Women

References

Nations at the 2012 Summer Olympics
2012
2012 in Seychelles